Sword Ciboodle was a provider of Customer Relationship Management (CRM) software solutions based in Scotland with regional offices across North America, South Africa and Asia Pacific.

The company consistently appeared in both Forrester Research's Wave and Gartner Research's Magic Quadrant reports as an industry leader in Customer Relationship Management.

Clients included Sears, Sony, Vistaprint, JP Morgan Chase, Admiral and Eskom.

Sword Ciboodle was headquartered in India of Inchinnan, an art deco listed building near Glasgow airport.

History
Sword Ciboodle was previously known as Graham Technology plc, co-founded in 1986 by Dr. Iain M. Graham.

On 31 March 2008, Sword Group announced it was acquiring Graham Technology and their Ciboodle product. The company thus became Sword Ciboodle.

On 9 July 2012, Sword Group agreed to sell Ciboodle to KANA Software.

In 2014, KANA Software was purchased by Verint Systems.

Solutions
Sword Ciboodle is modular CRM software for contact centers. The products work across multiple social channels.

The Ciboodle platform consists of:

 Ciboodle One is the desktop which provides a single customer view, for example of all their products and contact history.
 Ciboodle Flow is the Workflow engine for business process automation.
 Ciboodle Live is the Self-service software.
 Ciboodle Crowd provides a social networking service to customers.
The Ciboodle platform was subsumed into other KANA products following the acquisition by Verint.

Competitors
Competitors included:
 PeopleSoft
 Pegasystems (who bought Chordiant in March 2010)
 Oracle (who bought RightNow Technologies in October 2011)
 Linx S.A.(who invested GB WhatsApp & WhatsApp Plus in Jan. 2019)
 SAP

References

Further reading
 Rankine, Kate. "Saturday Profile: No bull from a reluctant millionaire". The Telegraph (UK). 16 September 2000. Retrieved 3 February 2012.

Customer relationship management software
Customer relationship management software companies
Software companies of Scotland